The Roman circus of Mérida is a ruined Roman circus in Mérida, Spain. Used for chariot racing, it was modelled on the Circus Maximus in Rome and other circus buildings throughout the Empire. Measuring more than 400 m in length and 30 m of width, it is one of the best preserved examples of Roman circus. It could house up to 30,000 spectators.

History
There is no consensus about the circus' dating, as it was built and used for several years before its official dedication. It seems to have been built sometime around 20 BC and inaugurated some 30 years later. It was located far outside the city walls, but close to the road that connected the city to Toledo and Córdoba.

After the fall of the Western Roman Empire and the rise of Christianity in Spain, the circus saw more use than the other Roman structures of Mérida, since racing was considered less sinful than spectacles performed in the Theatre and the Amphitheatre.

Modern status
Mérida's circus remains very well preserved. As is true with the Circus Maximus, most circuses's structures have been destroyed over time as the area occupied by them was great and often in very flat land near their respective cities. The Mérida circus however has kept numerous structures, including the Porta Pompae ("main entrance"), the Porta Triumphalis ("triumph gate"), the spina (the longitudinal wall), the tribunal iudicium ("tribune of the judges").

A museum dedicated to the circus now sits near the middle edge of the circus grounds and it allows admittance into the fenced area around the circus remains.

See also
 Archaeological Ensemble of Mérida
 Hippodrome – a Greek arena also used for chariot racing

References

Mérida
Circus of Mérida
Buildings and structures in Mérida, Spain
History of Extremadura
Buildings and structures completed in the 1st century BC
1st-century BC establishments in the Roman Republic
20 BC establishments
Tourist attractions in Extremadura